Ionikos Nikaias (full name Athlitikos Omilos Ionikos Nikaias, A.O. Ionikos Nikaias / ) is a Greek multi-sports club that is based in Nikaia, Piraeus. It was founded in 1965, and it has teams in football, basketball, and water polo. The club's name derives from Ionia, the birthplace of many residents of Nikaia, which came to Nikaia as refugees after the Asia Minor Disaster. The club's colours are blue and white.

Departments
Ionikos Nikaias F.C., football team 
Ionikos Nikaias B.C., basketball team that plays in Greek Basket League (2019–)
Ionikos Nikaias Water Polo, Water Polo team that plays in A2 Ethniki Water Polo (2016–17)
Ionikos Nikaias V.C.
Ionikos Nikaias Tennis Club
Ionikos Nikaias Boxing Club
Ionikos eSports
Ionikos Nikaias Weightlifting club
Ionikos Nikaias Softball club

History
Ionikos Nikaias was founded in 1965, after the merger of the two former clubs of Nikaia (in those years called Kokkinia), Aris Piraeus and A.E. Nikaia. The first departments of the club were the football and the basketball teams. These are the most successful departments of the club so far. The football team has played in the Greek Super League (1st-tier) many times, and it has reached a final of the Greek Cup. It has also played in the UEFA Cup three times.

The basketball team of Ionikos, was also founded in 1965. The most important period of the club was the late 1970s and early 1980s, when the club played in the top-tier level Greek Basket League. Ionikos had notable players, such as Panagiotis Giannakis, and it played two times in the FIBA Korać Cup.

Ionikos also had a notable volleyball team, that had a  presence in A1 Ethniki Volleyball. This team was merged with Aris Nikaias in 2001, and formed the team of A.E. Nikaia. The successor of Ionikos achieved a win of the Greek Volleyball Cup in 2003.

The water polo team of Ionikos plays in A2 Ethniki Water Polo.

Honours
Football Team
Greek Football Cup
Finalist (1): 2000

References

External links
football team
basketball team 
water polo team

 
1965 establishments in Greece